Santa Maria della Vittoria was a medieval chapel or small church in Mantua located on Piazzetta di San Simone.

It was built by Marchese Francesco Gonzaga in 1496 in memory of the French army of Charles VIII in the battle of Fornovo. The site had previously been the house of a Jewish moneylender, Daniele da Norsa. Apparently he had overpainted a fresco representation of the Virgin on the façade with his own coat of arms. The ruler at the time, Sigismondo Gonzaga, demanded that the iconic painting be restored, or Daniele would face execution.  Despite having accepted the unrefusable offer, a mob razed the house at the site. When Francesco returned, he pardoned the Jew, if he were to fund construction of the chapel . The architect Bernardino Ghisolfi designed the two story edifice. It once housed a famous altarpiece, the Madonna della Vittoria, painted by Mantegna; the painting was looted in 1797, is now at the Louvre.

References

Historic photographs of the church of Santa Maria della Vittoria

Maria Vittoria
Renaissance architecture in Mantua
15th-century Roman Catholic church buildings in Italy